The Ferrovia della Valtellina (Valtellina railway) is a railway line in Italy that runs from Lecco to Valtellina and Valchiavenna. It was opened in 1894 and electrified on the three-phase system in 1902.  It is now electrified at 3 kV direct current and operated by Trenord.

History
The line was built in stages between 1885 and 1894.  Two large railway companies dominated the area at the time. They were the Rete Adriatica (Adriatic network) and the Rete Mediterranea (Mediterranean network). with the opening of the Colico-Bellano section, on 1 August 1894 a complete railway service started.

Electrification

The Valtellina railway is notable for being an early user of electric traction. It was the first in Italy and the first in the world to use high-voltage three-phase alternating current for rail traction. On 15 October 1902 the electrification began on the Lecco-Colico-Chiavenna and Colico-Sondrio sections with overhead power lines at 3,000 V, 15 Hz. The frequency was later raised to 15.8 Hz for reasons unknown. Finally, the voltage and frequency were raised to 3,600 V, 16.7 Hz, which became an Italian standard.  Power was supplied by the Campovico hydroelectric plant.

The line is now electrified with 3 kV direct current.

The route
The line was built with great technical daring but the Lecco-Colico-Chiavenna section now shows its age. Over the 40 kilometres to Colico there are 89 curves, 18 viaducts and 19 tunnels. However, the line, which runs along the eastern shore of Lake Como with its jagged coastline, offers passengers enchanting views of inlets in which can be seen patrician villas, lush vegetation and lake marinas.

Tirano station is an interchange point for travellers who want to go to Switzerland on the Rhaetian Railway, a narrow-gauge line, departing from the aforementioned station that follows a route that reaches 2,253 metres in height and the famous tourist station St. Moritz.

Traffic
The line is used by regional trains of Trenord which run along the Sondrio-Lecco and Sondrio-Tirano routes (stopping at all stations), and from Regio Express trains - until 2007 called Diretti - of Trenord, many of which travel the entire Tirano route to Milan Central.

From December 2014, on public holidays and the month of August the Regional trains of Lecco-Sondrio terminate at Colico and are replaced by buses for the remaining section.

Rolling stock

Historical
Initially the rolling stock used, with three-phase alternating current, consisted of:
    RA 34, later, FS Class E.430, Bo+Bo locomotive
    RA 361, later FS Class E.360, 1′C1′ locomotive
    Railcars

Recent
More recently, compositions have been used, between Milan and Tirano, of an FS Class E.464 electric locomotive with 7 MDVC carriages [] and MDVC pilot, while the festive trains consist of FS Class ALe 803 electric multiple units or E.464 locomotives and low-floor carriages. Sometimes FS Class ALe 582 or, rarely, compositions of FS Class ALn 668 diesel railcars are used. From 2015 on the Milano Centrale-Tirano route, ETR 425 trainsets are used.

See also
 Lecco–Milan railway
 Tirano–Lecco railway

References

Railway companies of Italy
Railway lines in Lombardy